Planinska Vas is a settlement in the Municipality of Trbovlje in central Slovenia. It lies in the hills northwest of the town of Trbovlje. The area is part of the traditional region of Styria. It is now included with the rest of the municipality in the Central Sava Statistical Region.

References

External links
Planinska Vas on Geopedia

Populated places in the Municipality of Trbovlje